Domain Group (or simply Domain) is an Australian digital property portal and associated real-estate industry business. It is best known for its real-estate website domain.com.au, and also owns the brands commercialrealestate.com.au and allhomes.com.au. The company was a wholly-owned subsidiary of Fairfax Media from 1999 until November 2017, when Domain was listed on the Australian Stock Exchange as a public company, although Fairfax Media (now Nine) retained a 60% ownership of shares.

History

Founding
The company was founded by Fairfax Media, when the publisher branded their real-estate sections in print with the Domain brand and first established an online presence in 1999.

Public listing
In February 2015, the Australian Financial Review published an article highlighting Credit Suisse analyst expectations of a likely float of the Domain Group in the future, and attributed an AUD $1.3 billion valuation to the group.

On 21 February 2017 trading in Fairfax shares was suspended until half yearly results and an announcement of intent to turn Domain into a listed entity were announced. Domain Group was widely seen to "prop up" Fairfax revenues, as the company's publishing divisions were struggling.

Domain began trading on the ASX at midday (AEDT) on 16 November 2017, with shares opening at AU$3.80 giving the company, listed as Domain Holdings Australia (ASX:DHG), a valuation of nearly AU$2.2 billion.

Cricket sponsorship
In June 2018, Domain Group were announced as platinum partner of the Australian Men's Cricket Team. Under the deal, Domain became the presenting partner of men's test cricket over four years, which included the Ashes, and became the official real estate partner of Cricket Australia.

Description
The Domain Group is best known for its real-estate portal domain.com.au, which is Australia's second largest real-estate marketing business, with 90% market penetration. It competes directly with market leader REA Group, running real-estate.com.au, which is majority-owned by Nine rival News Corp Australia.

Assets
The Domain Group consists of a portfolio of businesses including but not limited to:
 The Domain and Allhomes (allhomes.com.au) residential property listings portals 
 The Commercial Real Estate commercial property portal (commercialrealestate.com.au)
 APM Pricefinder, a property data business whose products focus on modelling projected values of real estate for investors, agents and financial institutions
 Metro Media Publishing Group (MMP), which was fully acquired by Fairfax Media in January 2015 and consolidated into the Domain Group

References

External links
 

Australian real estate websites
Companies listed on the Australian Securities Exchange
Fairfax Media
Real estate companies of Australia
Nine Entertainment
1999 establishments in Australia